Andrew Agozzino (born January 3, 1991) is a Canadian professional ice hockey left wing for the  San Jose Sharks of the National Hockey League (NHL).

Playing career

Junior
Agozzino first played major junior hockey with the Niagara IceDogs of the Ontario Hockey League (OHL). He was originally selected as the Mississauga IceDogs first round draft pick, chosen 15th overall in the 2007 OHL Priority Draft before the team promptly relocated to Niagara. Agozzino scored 12 goals in 50 games during his rookie campaign in 2007–08 and as an Ontario native, he was selected to the Canada Ontario team for the 2008 World U-17 Hockey Challenge scoring five goals in six games to help capture the gold medal. In his sophomore season, Agozzino showed glimpses of leadership and improved to finish second on the IceDogs with 27 goals in the 2008–09 season. With two consecutive seasons of showing offensive potential, Agozzino was invited to the St. Louis Blues 2009 orientation camp. 

After the departure of former captain Alex Pietrangelo, Agozzino was named as the IceDogs new captain midway through the 2009–10 season. Agozzino led the IceDogs by example, scoring a team high 37 goals and 66 points. As the IceDogs representative to the 2010 OHL All-Star Classic, he was named as the Eastern Conference player of the game after scoring an All-Star record four goals. Undrafted in the NHL, due to his diminutive stature, Agozzino was signed upon the completion of the IceDogs season to an amateur try-out contract with the Peoria Rivermen of the American Hockey League (AHL), an affiliate of the Blues. He made his professional debut on April 9, 2010, against the Manitoba Moose and skated in the Rivermen's two final regular season games.

He returned to Niagara in the 2010–11 season, to again lead the team with 43 goals in 68 games. Without a professional contract on offer, Agozzino returned for his overage and final year with the IceDogs in 2011–12. For a third consecutive season, he led the team with 40 goals and produced a career high 48 assists and 88 points, to finish fifth in the OHL scoring race. After guiding the IceDogs to finish as finalists for the J. Ross Robertson Cup, Agozzino was selected as the recipient of the Leo Lalonde Memorial Trophy as the league top overage player and the Mickey Renaud Captain's Trophy as the league's best captain. He completed his junior career with the IceDogs with the franchise records in goals (159), assists (147), points (306) and games (316).

Professional
In his first full professional season in 2012–13, Agozzino was signed to a one-year AHL contract with the Lake Erie Monsters. In his Monsters debut on opening night, Agozzino scored his first professional goal and game-winner in a 2–1 victory over the Oklahoma City Barons on October 12, 2012. After initially claiming a role on the checking lines, he quickly and unexpectedly established himself amongst the Monsters scoring forwards to begin the season. At the midpoint of the season, and amongst the Monsters leaders in scoring, he was selected alongside fellow Monsters rookie Michael Sgarbossa to participate in the AHL All-Star Game. He subsequently became the first Monsters player in franchise history to then be voted as a starter to the victorious Western Conference All-Star lineup. On March 22, 2013, Agozzino's smooth transition to the professional ranks was completed when he was signed to a two-year entry level contract with the Colorado Avalanche, the NHL parent club of the Monsters. With Lake Erie out of the playoffs, he finished the regular season as one of only two skaters to have played in every game for the Monsters, whilst leading the team with 32 assists and 52 points.

In the 2014–15 season, with the Avalanche suffering a rash of injuries, Agozzino received his first NHL recall on November 21, 2014. He made his NHL debut with the Avalanche, registering an assist, in a 4–3 victory over the Carolina Hurricanes on November 22, 2014. Following the 2014–15 season, Agozzino became a restricted free agent under the NHL Collective Bargaining Agreement. The Avalanche made him a qualifying offer to retain his NHL rights and, on July 5, 2015, Agozzino filed for salary arbitration. On July 16, Agozzino settled before arbitration in agreeing to a one-year, two-way contract with the Avalanche.

Having left the Avalanche organization as a free agent, Agozzino agreed to a one-year, two-way contract with the St. Louis Blues on July 1, 2016. After attending the Blues 2016 training camp, Agozzino was assigned to begin the 2016–17 season, in the AHL with their affiliate, the Chicago Wolves. Following his adjustment to a new playing system, Agozzino remained in the AHL for the duration of the season in continuing his career scoring pace with 18 goals and 54 points in 71 games. Despite a solid performance with the Wolves, Agozzino was never recalled by the Blues. 

A year later, after leaving St. Louis as a free agent, Agozzino opted to return to his original club, the Colorado Avalanche, in signing a two-year, two-way contract. He primarily played with the Avalanche's AHL affiliates, the San Antonio Rampage and then the Colorado Eagles. In the 2018–19 season, Agozzino was named an alternate captain of the Eagles. He was also named to the 2019 AHL All-Star game that season. Agozzino scored his first NHL goal in the Avalanche's 3–0 win over the Vegas Golden Knights on February 19, 2019. He got into eleven games with the Avalanche in 2018–19.

As a free agent at the conclusion of his contract with the Avalanche, Agozzino left to sign a two-year, two-way $700,000 contract with the Pittsburgh Penguins on July 1, 2019. He began the 2019–20 season with AHL affiliate, the Wilkes-Barre/Scranton Penguins but was called up played a single game with the Penguins due to injuries. He played in the 2020 AHL All-Star Game. In a second recall to the NHL, Agozzino made a career best 17 appearances with the Penguins, notching two assists. At the trade deadline, Agozzino was placed on waivers by the Penguins and claimed the following day by the Anaheim Ducks on February 24, 2020. He appeared in three games with Anaheim and 31 games for their AHL affiliate, the San Diego Gulls.

On July 28, 2021, Agozzino was signed as a free agent to a one-year, two-way contract with the Ottawa Senators. He appeared in one game for Ottawa and led their AHL affiliate, the Belleville Senators in goals that season.

In the offseason, having left the Senators as a free agent, Agozzino was signed to a two-year, two-way contract with the San Jose Sharks on July 13, 2022.

Career statistics

Regular season and playoffs

International

Awards and honours

References

External links

1991 births
Anaheim Ducks players
Belleville Senators players
Canadian ice hockey left wingers
Chicago Wolves players
Colorado Avalanche players
Colorado Eagles players
Ice hockey people from Ontario
Lake Erie Monsters players
Living people
Niagara IceDogs players
Ottawa Senators players
People from Vaughan
Peoria Rivermen (AHL) players
Pittsburgh Penguins players
San Antonio Rampage players
San Diego Gulls (AHL) players
San Jose Barracuda players
Undrafted National Hockey League players
Wilkes-Barre/Scranton Penguins players
Canadian expatriate ice hockey players in the United States